Cryptocarya alba, the peumo or Chilean acorn, is an evergreen tree that grows in Chile and Argentina from 33 to 40° southern latitude. It can live both in wet and as in dry conditions. Its distribution can reach up to 1500 meters (5000 ft) above sea level. It measures up to 20 meters (65 ft) height and one meter diameter, with cracked gray bark. An associate tree is the endangered Chilean Wine Palm, Jubaea chilensis, which species prehistorically had a much wider range.

Description
Leaves are perennial, aromatic, simple, alternate and opposite, 2.5 to 8.5 cm long and one to four cm wide; aovate and entire lobe, a little undulate. The trunk is straight and hardly twisted; brown-grayish cork cambium, relatively smooth, with few cracks and detachable scales when old. Central branches thick and ascending; terminal twigs thin and hanging. The flowers are in dense bunches, greenish yellow and three to four mm long; hermaphrodite, they have six fleshy uneven and hairy petals. It produces edible fruits red-colored, called "peumos", which contain large heavy seeds, which germinate easily.

Cultivation and uses
It has very scented leaves. The fruit is a red berry and is edible. It blooms from November to January (southern hemisphere). The wood is very hard and resistant to moisture. The bark is used for tanning leather and dying orange color. It is appreciated as ornamental and fruit-producing tree. Planted trees in northern California have done very well. Rarely seen in Spain, it has adapted perfectly in that country.

References
C. Donoso. 2005. Árboles nativos de Chile. Guía de reconocimiento. Edición 4. Marisa Cuneo Ediciones, Valdivia, Chile. 136p.
Adriana Hoffman. 1998. Flora Silvestre de Chile, Zona Central. Edición 4. Fundación Claudio Gay, Santiago. 254p.
 C. Michael Hogan (2008) Chilean Wine Palm: Jubaea chilensis, GlobalTwitcher.com, ed. N. Stromberg
R. Rodríguez and M. Quezada. 2001. Laurales. En C. Marticorena and R. Rodríguez [eds.], Flora de Chile Vol. 2, pp 10–19. Universidad de Concepción, Concepción.

Line notes

External links

alba
Chilean Matorral
Flora of central Chile
Trees of Chile
Trees of Mediterranean climate
Chilean cuisine